The 1937 Philadelphia Eagles season was their fifth in the league. The team improved on their previous output of 1–11, winning two games. The team failed to qualify for the playoffs for the fifth consecutive season.

Off Season

NFL Draft 
The 1937 NFL Draft took place December 12, 1936. It would be for 10 rounds and teams picking a total of 100 players.

The Eagles would have the 1st pick in the draft. They used this pick to choose, running up in Heisman Trophy, Sam Francis, a back out of Nebraska. He never played a game for the Eagles but he did play for the Chicago Bears.

Player selections 
The table shows the Eagles selections and what picks they had that were traded away and the team that ended up with that pick. It is possible the Eagles' pick ended up with this team via another team that the Eagles made a trade with.
Not shown are acquired picks that the Eagles traded away.

Regular season 
The Eagles 1937 NFL season started on September 5 and ended 11 weeks later on November 14. The Eagles would play 4 games at home and 7 games on the road.

Schedule

Standings

NFL Playoffs 
With a 2–8–1 record in 1937, the Eagles do not make the playoffs and play in the 1937 NFL Championship Game. The Washington Redskins defeated Chicago Bears in Chicago.

Roster 
(All time List of Philadelphia Eagles players in franchise history)

A List of the 1937 Philadelphia Eagles.

Postseason 
With a record of 2–8–1 the Philadelphia Eagles failed to make it to the NFL Championship game

References 

Philadelphia Eagles seasons
Philadelphia Eagles
Philadelphia Eag